Madison Township is one of twelve townships in Dubois County, Indiana. As of the 2010 census, its population was 2,696 and it contained 935 housing units.

History
The Shiloh Presbyterian Church was listed on the National Register of Historic Places in 1982.

Geography

Unincorporated towns
 Ireland
 Millersport
(This list is based on USGS data and may include former settlements.)

Adjacent townships
 Boone Township (north)
 Bainbridge Township (east)
 Patoka Township (southeast)
 Lockhart Township, Pike County (southwest)
 Marion Township, Pike County (west)
 Jefferson Township, Pike County (northwest)

Major highways
  Indiana State Road 56

Cemeteries
The township contains six cemeteries: Alexander, Armstrong, Dillin, Hobbs, Mount Zion and Payne.

References
 United States Census Bureau cartographic boundary files
 U.S. Board on Geographic Names

External links
 Indiana Township Association
 United Township Association of Indiana

Townships in Dubois County, Indiana
Jasper, Indiana micropolitan area
Townships in Indiana